Toyota Motor Manufacturing Czech Republic s.r.o., also known by its initials TMMCZ, is a Czech automobile manufacturer headquartered in Kolín, Czech Republic. It was originally established in 2002 by the Toyota Motor Corporation and the PSA Group (previously PSA Peugeot Citroën) as a 50:50 joint venture known as Toyota Peugeot Citroën Automobile Czech s.r.o. (TPCA) until 2021. On 1 January 2021, two years after announcement of the end of the joint venture in Europe, Toyota acquired the remaining 50% of PSA's interest in TPCA and adopted its present name, although the new Toyota Yaris was launched on the same year.

History

TPCA was established in March 2002 and production started in February 2005.

In November 2018, PSA and Toyota announced the end of their joint venture in Europe. On 1 January 2021, the plant became a wholly owned subsidiary of Toyota Motor Europe and was renamed as Toyota Motor Manufacturing Czech Republic, making it its 8th plant in Europe.

Products
The company originally produced three cars that were, in essence, the same but badge engineered: the Citroën C1, Peugeot 107 and Toyota Aygo. These cars shared the vast majority of parts with only small cosmetic alterations. The project was called B-Zero after its city car market segment.

In 2014, the next generation models were launched, with Citroën and Toyota retaining their existing model names, and Peugeot naming their new version the 108. The second generation joint venture still shares many key components, but there are more visual differences between the different marques.

Current products 
Toyota Aygo X (2021–present)
Toyota Yaris (XP210) (2021–present)

Former products
Citroën C1 (2005–2021)
Peugeot 107 (2005–2014)
Peugeot 108 (2014–2021)
Toyota Aygo (2005–2021)

2010 recall
In January 2010, Toyota announced a worldwide recall on several of their vehicles for a faulty sticking accelerator pedal - in which the Aygo is affected. Under certain circumstances, the pedal can stick in a partially depressed position, or return slowly to the off position. PSA Peugeot Citroën followed suit, announcing a recall of "under 100,000 units" of the Citroën C1 and the Peugeot 107 for the same issue. New information from Toyota has suggested, however, that only Aygos and Peugeot 107s with Aisin Ez-drive automated manual gearboxes (Multi-mode/2-Tronic) are affected, and that those with manual gearboxes are not.

Sales

References

External links
 

Toyota subsidiaries
Toyota factories
Motor vehicle assembly plants in the Czech Republic
Buildings and structures in Kolín
2002 establishments in the Czech Republic
Vehicle manufacturing companies established in 2002